Emilienstraße is a metro station on the Hamburg U-Bahn line U2. The underground station was opened in October 1913 and is located in the Hamburg district of Eimsbüttel, Germany. Eimsbüttel is center of the Hamburg borough of Eimsbüttel.

Service

Trains 
Emilienstraße is served by Hamburg U-Bahn line U2; departures are every 5 minutes.

See also 

 List of Hamburg U-Bahn stations

References

External links 

 Line and route network plans at hvv.de 

Hamburg U-Bahn stations in Hamburg
U2 (Hamburg U-Bahn) stations
Buildings and structures in Eimsbüttel
Railway stations in Germany opened in 1913